The castra of Fâlfani was a fort built in the 2nd century AD in the Roman province of Dacia. It was abandoned in the 3rd century. Its ruins are located on a hill in Fâlfani (commune Stolnici, Romania).

See also
List of castra

Notes

External links
Roman castra from Romania - Google Maps / Earth

Roman legionary fortresses in Romania
Roman legionary fortresses in Dacia
History of Muntenia